The Men's 85 kg weightlifting competitions at the 2016 Summer Olympics in Rio de Janeiro took place on 12 August at the Pavilion 2 of Riocentro.

On October 13, 2016, the IWF reported that bronze medalist Gabriel Sincraian of Romania had tested positive for excess testosterone in a test connected to the Rio Olympics.

Schedule
All times are Time in Brazil (UTC-03:00)

Records
Prior to this competition, the existing world and Olympic records were as follows.

Results

 was originally on the entry list but was ejected from the Games after testing positive for a banned substance on July 25.

New records

References

Weightlifting at the 2016 Summer Olympics
Men's events at the 2016 Summer Olympics